Maryam Khan (born 1988) is a Pakistan-born American politician who has been a member of the Connecticut House of Representatives since winning a special election to the 5th House District of Windsor and Hartford in 2022. She is the first Muslim elected to the Connecticut House of Representatives and the second elected to the Connecticut General Assembly after State Senator Saud Anwar.

Background 
Khan emigrated to the United States from Pakistan as a child in 1994. Khan was a special educational needs teacher before entering politics.

Political career 
Khan won nearly 75% of the votes the special-election in the 5th district to succeed Brandon McGee in 2022.

Personal life 
Khan lives in Windsor, Connecticut, with her husband and three children.

Electoral history

References 

Living people
1989 births
Central Connecticut State University alumni
Democratic Party members of the Connecticut House of Representatives
21st-century American politicians
21st-century American women politicians
Women state legislators in Connecticut
21st-century Muslims
American Muslims
Pakistani emigrants to the United States
American politicians of Pakistani descent